Moj Kiosk Group is a Serbian holding company with headquarters in Belgrade, Serbia. It has five subsidiaries and performs variety of services, such as distribution and retail of consumer goods, newspapers, non-alcoholic beverages and confectionery through "Moj Kiosk" convenience stores.

History
The company was established in 1976 under name "Centroproizvod". In 2011, "Centroproizvod" acquired majority share in "Štampa Sistem" for 5 million euros and in bankrupted Futura plus for 27.66 million euros. At the time of purchase, Futura plus had 2,300 employees and a total of 800 kiosk retail stores. In March 2012, "Centro štampa Holding" re-branded all kiosk retail stores of "Futura plus" and "Štampa sistem" under "Moj Kiosk" brand name. In March 2014, "Futura plus" went out of bankruptcy, after four and a half years. In the same month, "Centro štampa" opened facility in Ub where convenience stores are being manufactured and repaired. In March 2015, all subsidiary companies under "Centro štampa Holding" became subsidiaries of "Centroproizvod" holding company. "Centroproizvod" later changed its name to "Moj Kiosk Group".

As of 2017, Moj Kiosk Group subsidiaries Futura plus and "Centro štampa" conducts retail sales through "Moj Kiosk" brand of kiosk retail stores across Serbia. It also has regional and depot centres, and wholesale operations (suppliers, publishers, advertising companies, purchases) and services in the fields of marketing, distribution and transport.

Ownership
As of July 2019, "Property Plus Establishment" company which is run by Serbian businessman Darko Bajčetić is the majority owner of Moj Kiosk Group.

References

External links
 
 Moj Kiosk

1976 establishments in Yugoslavia
Companies based in Belgrade
D.o.o. companies in Serbia
Holding companies of Serbia
Holding companies established in 1976
Retail companies of Serbia
Serbian brands
Retail companies established in 1976